K226 or K-226 may refer to:

K-226 (Kansas highway), a former state highway in Kansas
HMS Godetia (K226), a former UK Royal Navy ship